Messent may refer to:

People
Claire Messent, an Australian field hockey player

Places
Messent Conservation Park, a protected area in South Australia
Messent Peak, a mountain in Antarctica
Hundred of Messent, a cadastral unit in South Australia